U.S. Route 383 was a north–south United States highway.  US 383 was created in 1942, and deleted in 1982.  After deletion, a portion of the highway became K-383.

Route description

Kansas

US-383 began in Oakley, heading north along present-day US-83. A short distance north of Oakley, the route intersected I-70. In Halford, US-83/US-383 crossed over US-24. From here, the road turned northeast, where US-383 split from US-83 near Leoville. US-383 continued to the northeast until meeting US-36. At this point, the route turned east for a concurrency with US-36, crossing US-283 in Norton. Past Norton, US-383 split from US-36 and resumed northeast, reaching an intersection with US-183 near Woodruff a short distance south of the Nebraska border.

Nebraska
In Nebraska, US-383 continued north on the present alignment of US-183, reaching an intersection with US-136 in Alma. Prior to 1964, US-383 continued north past Alma, intersecting US-6/US-34 in Holdrege before ending at US-30 in Elm Creek.

History
In 1964, the north end of US 383 was truncated to Alma, Nebraska.

Major intersections

See also

Related routes
 U.S. Route 83
 U.S. Route 183
 U.S. Route 283
 K-383

References

External links

Historic endpoints of U.S. Highway 383

Former U.S. Highways
U.S. Highways in Kansas
U.S. Highways in Nebraska
83-3
3